Andrew P. Bakaj (b. 1982) is a Washington, D.C. attorney and former intelligence officer with the Central Intelligence Agency. He was the principal attorney representing the whistleblower who filed the initial complaint that led to the launch of multiple investigations by the United States Congress into the Trump–Ukraine scandal, the impeachment inquiry into President Donald Trump, and, ultimately, the first impeachment of Donald Trump.

Bakaj is the founding and managing partner of Compass Rose Legal Group. He represented multiple whistleblowers and government officials in the U.S. House of Representatives investigations into the Trump Administration. Previously while serving as a U.S. government official, he designed the legal and investigative apparatus to protect intelligence community whistleblowers.

Early life and education 

Bakaj was born in Stamford, Connecticut and is a graduate of Trinity Catholic High School. He subsequently went on to attend The George Washington University, Elliott School of International Affairs in Washington, D.C. from which he earned a bachelor's degree in International Affairs with a concentration in National Security Policy. Bakaj earned his Juris Doctor from Syracuse University College of Law in Syracuse, New York, specializing in both national security law and public international law. Bakaj is of Ukrainian descent and is Ukrainian Catholic.

Career 
As a student attending The George Washington University, Bakaj interned for three United States Senators: Daniel Patrick Moynihan, Charles Schumer, and Hillary Clinton. Bakaj's internship with Clinton coincided with the September 11 attacks, and he worked directly for her foreign policy advisor. Subsequently, in 2002, Bakaj served the Department of State overseas with the U.S. Embassy in Kyiv, Ukraine. During his tour and while traveling to Lviv, Ukraine, on mission, a deadly air show accident occurred at the Sknyliv Airfield. Due to his proficiency in Ukrainian and proximity to the disaster, Bakaj coordinated with the Embassy in Kyiv to secure emergency aid from the United States.

Bakaj continued his public service while in law school, clerking with the Department of Justice. Upon graduating law school, he became a government official with the Department of Defense Office of Inspector General and subsequently the Central Intelligence Agency Office of Inspector General.

While with the Department of Defense, Bakaj created the department's legal and investigative framework for national security whistleblower reprisal investigations. As a consequence of this accomplishment, the Department of Defense recognized him with a Career Achievement Award. The program he developed became the model for what would eventually become Presidential Policy Directive 19 (PPD-19), Protecting Whistleblowers with Access to Classified Information, issued by President Barack Obama in 2012. Bakaj eventually transitioned to the CIA where he created a whistleblower protection program modeled on the one he developed at the Defense Department so as to comply with the directive.

In 2014, Bakaj was instrumental in protecting CIA officers within the Office of Inspector General who reported misconduct within their chain-of-command and, ultimately, to him. The disclosures included allegations that individuals within his own office (the CIA Office of Inspector General) fabricated evidence in a federal criminal investigation in order to obtain a false prosecution.

In elevating the matter, he protected the whistleblowers who disclosed the information to him. Because he refused to compromise their identity, Bakaj himself was ultimately reprised against by then-Inspector General David B. Buckley, an Obama appointee.

In 2017, President Donald Trump nominated Christopher Sharpley to assume the role of CIA Inspector General. Shortly after Sharpley's confirmation hearing, Bakaj presented evidence to the Senate Select Committee on Intelligence establishing that Sharpley was less than candid during his confirmation hearing. As a result of Bakaj's disclosure, the White House subsequently withdrew Sharpley's nomination. In 2018 Sharpley resigned from the CIA.

In 2019, a years-long investigation found that Buckley illegally reprised against Bakaj.

Upon transitioning from government service, Bakaj assumed the role as Special Of Counsel with Mark S. Zaid, P.C. and founded Compass Rose Legal Group, PLLC.

Impeachment Inquiry Against President Donald Trump 

Bakaj was lead counsel representing the whistleblower who filed the initial complaint that led to the launch of multiple investigations by the United States Congress into the Trump–Ukraine scandal, the impeachment inquiry into President Donald Trump, and, ultimately, the first Impeachment of Donald Trump. Bakaj's co-counsel was Mark Zaid.

A friend of the whistleblower, who is an attorney and an expert on national security law, referred the whistleblower to Bakaj, who had more expertise on whistleblower procedure and law. Bakaj provided the whistleblower guidance on filing the complaint. On August 11, 2019, per Bakaj's guidance, the whistleblower filed the complaint with the Inspector General of the Intelligence Community (IGIC). The whistleblower's complaint was deemed credible and a matter of "urgent concern" by the IGIC. Under federal law, when the IGIC determines that an complaint credibly raises an urgent concern, he or she forwards it to the relevant agency head (here, the DNI), who is required to forward it to the congressional intelligence committees within seven days. In this case, however, Acting Director of National Intelligence Joseph Maguire withheld the complaint from Congress.

On September 9, 2019, Bakaj hand-delivered a letter informing the House Permanent Select Committee on Intelligence of the complaint's existence and that “The ICIG has informed [Bakaj] that . . . . my client’s disclosure will not be transmitted to Congress because the Acting Director of National Intelligence views the matter as 'outside the scope' of the applicable whistleblower statute". The next day, the committee's Democratic chairman, Adam Schiff, wrote Maguire demanding the release the complaint, and was rebuffed. Maguire later testified that the White House counsel had told him he could not release the whistle-blower's complaint to Congress because it was covered by executive privilege. Schiff went public. Facing a subpoena, the DNI finally released the complaint to Congress on September 25, 2019.

On September 24, 2019, because his client's complaint was being blocked from transmittal to Congress, Bakaj sent a letter to Maguire providing "formal notice" of his intent to contact congressional intelligence committees directly concerning the matter. The following day the White House authorized the complaint be transmitted to congress.

On November 7, 2019, Bakaj sent a letter to the White House warning President Trump to "cease and desist" calling for the public disclosure of the whistleblower's identity and "engaging in rhetoric and activity that places the whistleblower and their family in physical danger." He said the president would be legally and morally liable if anyone were to be "physically harmed as a result of his, or his surrogates', behavior." 

It has been reported that Bakaj and his co-counsel, Mark Zaid, have received death threats that are being investigated by the FBI.

In a New York Times op-ed on March 2, 2020, Bakaj advocated protecting, expanding, and enhancing federal whistleblower protection laws.

In a Washington Post op-ed on April 14, 2020, Bakaj expressed concern about the purging of inspectors general following Michael Atkinson's firing by President Trump, stating that "alarm bells should be going off". Bakaj and authors Zaid and John Tye discussed the impact of such actions. In light of the President questioning the independence and integrity of the Health and Human Services Inspector General and removing Glenn A. Fine as chairman overseeing the Pandemic Response Accountability Committee, a position for which he was selected by his peers, they wrote about the need for effective government oversight during the COVID-19 Global Pandemic.

Facebook Files 

Following her initial disclosures, Bakaj took over as lead counsel representing Frances Haugen for her whistleblower activities against Facebook in what has become known as the Facebook Files. In October 2021 the Washington Post reported “Andrew Bakaj, who represents Haugen at Whistleblower Aid, said it was ‘immediately clear’ that she had materials that were critical for lawmakers and regulators seeking to hold the company accountable. ‘She’s a perfect example of why whistleblowers are so important: Without her, we didn’t know what we didn’t know,’ Bakaj told the Post.”

Other Notable Casework 

Bakaj is among the attorneys representing Lieutenant Colonel Yevgeny Vindman, whose twin brother Alexander Vindman served as a key witness in President Donald Trump's first impeachment, in a whistleblower reprisal complaint filed with the Pentagon's Inspector General. The complaint alleges Vindman was retaliated against by the President and senior White House officials for his role as a whistleblower. Bakaj is also a member of the team representing Brian Murphy, the former Acting Under Secretary for the Office of Intelligence and Analysis with the Department of Homeland Security. Murphy alleges that he was told to avoid intelligence assessments on Russia and white supremacists. Bakaj has also been involved in representing U.S diplomats who have been impacted by the Havana Syndrome in Cuba.

Awards and Professional Recognition

•	Washingtonian named Bakaj among Washington’s "Most Influential People" (Legal Intelligencia), writing “Policymaking changes as governments come in and out of power. But the bedrock underlying it—expertise that enables public service and good-faith debate and explains why idealists still come to Washington—remains. Here’s a look at who’s wielding that influence right now."

•	Washingtonian named Bakaj among Washington's "Top Lawyers: Whistleblowers".

•	The Metropolitan Washington Employment Lawyers Association named him Lawyer of the Year for 2020.

•	In 2012 the Department of Defense Office of Inspector General presented Bakaj with a Career Achievement Award.

•	In 2012 the Department of Defense Office of Inspector General named him "Investigator of the Year".

•	In 2011 Bakaj was a member of a team named as a finalist in the Samuel J. Heyman Service to America Award (National Security and International Affairs).

See also

 Trump–Ukraine scandal
 Impeachment inquiry against Donald Trump
 First impeachment of Donald Trump
List of George Washington University alumni
:List of Elliott School of International Affairs people

References

External links
 Official website, Compass Rose Legal Group, PLLC
 Whistleblower Aid

Syracuse University alumni
Syracuse University College of Law alumni
People of the Central Intelligence Agency
People from Stamford, Connecticut
Living people
Whistleblowing in the United States
American whistleblowers
Year of birth missing (living people)